On July 18, 2018, University of Iowa student Mollie Cecilia Tibbetts disappeared while jogging near her home in Brooklyn, Iowa. A month later, police identified 24-year-old Cristhian Bahena Rivera as a suspect in connection with the disappearance; surveillance footage showed Rivera's car following Tibbetts on her jog. Rivera led police to the body of Tibbetts in a Poweshiek County cornfield on August 21. He was charged with first-degree murder. On May 28, 2021, Rivera was found guilty of first-degree murder. On August 30, 2021, Rivera was sentenced to life in prison without parole.

Rivera's immigration status became a politicized issue after police, the U.S. Citizenship and Immigration Services (USCIS), and U.S. Immigration and Customs Enforcement (ICE) indicated that he had been in the United States illegally. The Trump administration and some Republicans, including Iowa governor Kim Reynolds, argued the murder could have been prevented with more restrictive immigration policies. Tibbetts's family denounced efforts to use Tibbetts's death for political purposes.

Victim 

Mollie Cecilia Tibbetts was born on May 8, 1998, in San Francisco, California, to Rob Tibbetts and Laura Tibbetts. When she was in the second grade, her parents divorced, and she moved to Iowa with her mother and two siblings. Her father kept a close relationship with the children, and he last saw Mollie at his wedding in June 2018. She worked at a children's day camp at Grinnell Regional Medical Center and was preparing for her sophomore year in college when she disappeared.

Disappearance
On July 18, 2018, Tibbetts, a former cross country runner, left the home of her boyfriend in Brooklyn for an evening jog. She was last seen at approximately 7:30 p.m. CDT and was reported missing by her family when she did not show up for work the following day. According to police, her last confirmed communication was with her boyfriend of three years, shortly before leaving for her jog. He told investigators he received a Snapchat message from her later in the evening that appeared to show her indoors.

Investigation
Over the next several weeks, police in multiple states investigated hundreds of leads in the case, including an unconfirmed sighting at a truck stop in Kearney, Missouri (later confirmed to have been false), but were not able to locate Tibbetts. They received over 2,300 tips and conducted over 500 interviews during the course of the investigation. As she was known to always wear her Fitbit activity tracker, police attempted to use its data to help find her.

About four weeks after Tibbetts' disappearance, police said that the search had been refocused to several specific areas in and around Brooklyn, including her boyfriend's home, a truck stop, a car wash, and two area farms. Prior to the discovery of Tibbetts' body, monetary rewards for information leading to closure in the case had reached over $366,000, surpassing the previous record reward amount raised by the local Crime Stoppers branch. As the money was to be used as a reward on the condition of her safe return, Crime Stoppers announced that the money would be returned to those who requested it, or dispersed to the general Crime Stoppers fund and/or to the Tibbetts family.

On August 21, police in Iowa announced that a body had been found in Poweshiek County, where Tibbetts' hometown of Brooklyn is located; the body was identified as Tibbetts' in an autopsy that was conducted two days later by the Iowa State Medical Examiner. They had been led to the site by 24-year-old suspect Cristhian Bahena Rivera.

On August 23, the Iowa State Medical Examiner performed an autopsy and recorded the cause of death as "multiple sharp force injuries" and the manner as homicide.

Suspect 

Cristhian Bahena Rivera, aged 24 at the time of the crime, lived and worked in the rural Poweshiek County area where Tibbetts vanished. Originally from El Guayabillo, Guerrero, Mexico, he arrived illegally in the United States at age 17 and had lived in the area for several years. He had worked at another farm before coming to Yarrabee Farms near Brooklyn, Iowa, in August 2014. Rivera self-identified and received his paychecks under the name John Budd.

Rivera became a target of investigators after they obtained footage from a nearby surveillance camera, showing a Chevrolet Malibu driving back and forth in the area where Tibbetts was jogging. After linking the car to him, police approached him without incident. They said that he confessed to kidnapping and killing her, and then dumping her body. According to an affidavit filed by the Poweshiek County Sheriff's Office, he led them to the body in a secluded location within a cornfield.

Immigration status 

A spokesman on the behalf of the U.S. Citizenship and Immigration Services said its systems did not indicate Rivera "has any lawful immigration status." Later, U.S. Immigration and Customs Enforcement confirmed this determination, by saying "law enforcement remains absolutely confident that we've correctly identified the suspect as an illegal alien from Mexico, based both on investigative interviews with him and on records checks." Rivera worked at Yarrabee Farms, owned by the family of a prominent Iowa Republican leader, Craig Lang. As part of his employment, the Lang family allowed Rivera to live rent-free on their land. Yarrabee Farms initially claimed that they had vetted Rivera's immigration status through the federal E-Verify program. After E-Verify indicated that Yarrabee Farms was not subscribed to its program, Yarrabee Farms said it used the Social Security Administration system and clarified that Rivera had given them false information. In a motion for a gag order on August 22, Rivera's lawyer said Rivera was in the United States legally, but was ultimately unable to provide any evidence that supported this claim and his lawyer withdrew from the case several days later.

Legal proceedings 

On August 22, 2018, Rivera was charged with first-degree murder. The judge raised his bond from $1 million to $5 million when the prosecutor noted him as a flight risk.

On August 24, Rivera changed his legal counsel. Chad and Jennifer Frese, a married couple who work for the same law firm, were privately retained by Rivera's relatives to represent him. On September 19, Rivera pleaded not guilty.

On May 17, 2021, Rivera's criminal trial began, after many delays due to other court proceedings and to the ongoing COVID-19 pandemic.

On May 28, 2021, Rivera was found guilty of first degree murder. The judge ordered him to be held without bond.

Rivera faced a mandatory sentence of life imprisonment without parole. The state of Iowa has no death penalty.

On August 30, 2021, Rivera was sentenced to life in prison without parole.

As of October 26, 2021, VINELink shows that Rivera is incarcerated at the Iowa State Penitentiary (ISP) at Fort Madison, Iowa. This is a Maximum Security Prison, where he will be serving out his life sentence.

Reactions

Memorials and tributes 
Tibbetts' younger brother and his football team memorialized her by printing her initials on the team jerseys. Some runners used the hashtag #MilesforMollie to highlight harassment and safety issues experienced by women who run, since she had been attacked while running. Her friends started an online group that gained attention on social media called "The Mollie Movement", which encourages people to be kind to each other in her honor. During her funeral, her family called for mourners to remember her passion for life and desire to help others, by "celebrating something wonderful", such as her father highlighting the marriage of Blake and Allie Jack, who had been married the day previous. Mollie would have been maid of honor at their wedding.

Politicization of Tibbetts's death 

The case became a political talking point for more restrictive immigration policies. Opponents of illegal immigration emphasized that the suspect had entered the country illegally, despite research showing that undocumented immigrants are less likely to commit crimes than native-born Americans. Liberals characterized the politicization of Tibbetts's murder as fearmongering.  Vice President Mike Pence called attention to the case at the beginning of a speech in Des Moines on August 15, telling a crowd of President Donald Trump's supporters that the government would continue to provide "any and all federal support" to the case. Pence later met with the Tibbetts family aboard Air Force Two. President Trump on August 22 said: “A person came in from Mexico illegally and killed her. We need the wall, we need our immigration laws changed, we need our border laws changed." A campaign email sent by the Donald J. Trump for President, Inc. committee blamed Democrats' immigration policies for Tibbetts' death.

In August 2018, after the body of Tibbetts was recovered, the Tibbetts family released a statement in which they asked for time and privacy. In addition, Tibbetts' father—responding to Donald Trump, Jr.—criticized as "heartless" and "despicable" the use of Tibbetts's death for political purposes; he especially decried its use against immigrants. Tibbetts's father said, "The Hispanic community are Iowans. They have the same values as Iowans. As far as I'm concerned, they're Iowans with better food". He denounced those who "appropriate Mollie's soul in advancing views she believed were profoundly racist".

See also 

 Crime in Iowa
 Illegal immigration to the United States and crime
 List of solved missing person cases
 Shooting of Kate Steinle

References

2010s missing person cases
2018 controversies in the United States
2018 in American politics
2018 in Iowa
2018 murders in the United States
Deaths by person in Iowa
Deaths by stabbing in Iowa
Female murder victims
Formerly missing people
July 2018 crimes in the United States
July 2018 events in the United States
Illegal immigration to the United States
Incidents of violence against women
Missing person cases in Iowa
Murdered American students
People murdered in Iowa
Political controversies in the United States
Trump administration controversies
Violence against women in the United States
Women in Iowa